The Drin (or) is a river in Southern and Southeastern Europe with two distributaries one discharging into the Adriatic Sea and the other one into the Bojana River. Its catchment area extends across Albania, Kosovo, Serbia, Greece, Montenegro and North Macedonia. The river and its tributaries form the Gulf of Drin, an ocean basin that encompasses the northern Albanian Adriatic Sea Coast.

It starts at the confluence of its two headwaters, namely the Black Drin and White Drin. It originates in the mountainous northern mountain range, flows westwards through the Albanian Alps and Dukagjin Highlands, and eventually drains into the Adriatic Sea, between Shëngjin and Durrës. Numerous lakes and reservoirs are formed by the river or flow into it such as the Fierza Lake and Koman Lake.

Located in the Balkan Peninsula at the crossroad of Europe and Asia, the river basin's varied climate and topography have shaped a vast array of flora and fauna. In addition, it has been recognised as one of the most important biodiversity hotspots in Europe. The Drin Delta is classified as an Important Bird Area of international importance by designation under the BirdLife International Convention.

Name
The name of the river is recorded in Ancient Greek as Drilon (Δρίλων) and in Latin as Drinus. The name is considered to be of Illyrian origin. The form Drin- has been evidenced by Pliny the Elder ( 1st century AD) and is most likely primary. The ancient name Drinus has undergone sound changes reaching the current Albanian form Drin through the evolution of Albanian sound changes. The Macedonian name of the river is Дрим, Drim. Homonym rivers are Drino between southern Albania and northwestern Greece, and Drina between Bosnia and Herzegovina and Serbia.

Overview 

The Drin originates near the town of Kukës, in the northeast of Albania, at the confluence of the rivers Black Drin and White Drin. It then flows west for about  passing through the Albanian Alps and Fierzë then upon reaching the Dukagjini highlands, flowing then to the south through Apripë e Gurit, Toplanë, Dushman, Koman, Vjerdhë Mazrrek, Rragam, and Pale Lalej. At Vau i Dejës, it enters the low Shkodër Field and splits into two arms. One empties into the Gulf of Drin into the Adriatic Sea southwest of Lezhë, forming the Mouth of Drin. The other empties into the Bojana River near the Rozafa Castle.

The Black Drin flows out from the Lake Ohrid near Struga and flow through eastern Albania and western North Macedonia. The White Drin originates from the Zhleb mountain, north of the town of Peja in the Metohija region of Kosovo, and flows from there through to Albania. 
 
The basin encompasses the transboundary subbasins of Lake Shkodër (largest lake in Southern Europe), Lake Ohrid (one of the most ancient lakes in the World), Lake Prespa and Small Prespa Lake and also the tributaries, namely Black Drin, White Drin and Bojana River. All these subbasins and tributaries are home to numerous species of mammals, vascular plants, insects, amphibians, fish and birds.
 
The Drin is extremely important for the Albanian economy, especially for its electrical production. Four hydropower facilities produce most of Albania's electricity (over 1200MW capacity). The artificial Lake Fierza created by the dam at Fierzë is the largest artificial lake in Albania with its surface of 73 km². The second largest artificial lake is also built on this river. Vau i Dejës lake has an area of 25 km². Construction of the Fierza power station caused some controversy in the 1980s. Without reaching any agreement, the Albanian government ordered the reservoir to be filled with water, which flooded some border areas of Kosovo, then part of Yugoslavia. The Yugoslav government protested, but no solution was agreed on. Thus, today, Lake Fierza is shared by Albania and Kosovo.

Human history 

The ancient name of the river was Drilon. The valley of the river was inhabited by several Illyrian peoples. It was probably dominated at some point and to some extent by the Enchele. The tribal territory of the Taulantii and of the Labeatae was most likely located near the river.

See also 

 Gulf of Drin
 Geography of Albania
 Central Mountain Range
 Rivers of Albania

Notes

Bibliography

Further reading 
 Mala Prosvetina Enciklopedija, Third edition (1985); Prosveta; 
 Jovan Đ. Marković (1990): Enciklopedijski geografski leksikon Jugoslavije; Svjetlost-Sarajevo;

References 

 
Rivers of Albania
Rivers of Kosovo
Rivers of North Macedonia
Important Bird Areas of Albania
Braided rivers in Albania
International rivers of Europe
Geography of Peja District